Kateh-ye Khafr-e Sofla (also Romanized as Kateh-ye Khafr-e Soflá; also known as Kat-e Khafr-e Soflá) is a village in Jereh Rural District, Jereh and Baladeh District, Kazerun County, Fars Province, Iran. At the 2006 census, its population was 29, in 5 families.

References 

Populated places in Kazerun County